Mount Pisgah is an unincorporated community in Milford Township, LaGrange County, Indiana.

A post office was established at Mount Pisgah in 1848, and remained in operation until it was discontinued in 1907.

Geography

References

Unincorporated communities in LaGrange County, Indiana
Unincorporated communities in Indiana